Shabu or syabu may refer to:
 Shabu, a slang term for the drug methamphetamine used in Japan, Hong Kong, Philippines, Malaysia and Indonesia.
 Ya ba, also called shabú (Philippines), pills with a mixture of methamphetamine and caffeine prevalent throughout Asia.
 Shabu, a fictional genie from the sitcom Just Our Luck
 Shabu, one of the traditional dances of Himachal Pradesh
 Shabu, a name for tapioca in Bengali cuisine
 Shabu, Iran, (شبو), a village in South Khorasan Province, Iran
 Shabu, Qinzhou (沙埠镇), town in Qinnan District, Qinzhou, Guangxi, China
 Shabu, Taizhou, Zhejiang (沙埠镇), town in Huangyan District, Taizhou, Zhejiang, China

See also
 Shabu-shabu, a Japanese variant of hot pot